Karen Riese Fraser (born September 12, 1944) is an American politician who served as a Democratic Washington State Senator for 24 years, representing the 22nd Legislative District, which includes Olympia, Lacey, Tumwater, and northern Thurston County. She held many senior leadership positions in the Senate including:  Democratic Caucus Chair; Vice Chair of the Ways and Means Committee; Chair of the Capital Budget; chair of the Senate's administrative committee; and chair of policy committees pertaining to environment, energy, water, parks and recreation, shorelines, Puget Sound, and state employee pensions. She served on the Rules Committee and on many other policy committees. She was a leader in state level international relations.

Prior to serving in the Senate, she served four years as State Representative. She served as a local elected official for 15 years, including becoming the first woman mayor of Lacey, the second woman Thurston County Commissioner, and the first woman President of the Washington State Association of Counties.

Fraser was an unsuccessful candidate for Lieutenant Governor in the 2016 primary election, which she ultimately lost to fellow Democrat Cyrus Habib.

In October 2017, the Olympia Woodland Trail was renamed to the Karen Fraser Woodland Trail in her honor.

Education
Fraser graduated from the University of Washington with a bachelor's degree in sociology and a Master of Public Administration from the university's Daniel J. Evans School of Public Affairs. She was founder of the Legislative International Caucus.

Personal life 
Fraser was born in Seattle and currently resides in Thurston County, Washington. She has one daughter and two grandchildren. She enjoys outdoor recreation, such as hiking, sailboat racing, marathon running, and travel.

See also
Washington State Legislature

References

External links
http://www.karenfraserforltgovernor.com

1944 births
Living people
Mayors of places in Washington (state)
People from Lacey, Washington
County commissioners in Washington (state)
Washington (state) state senators
Women state legislators in Washington (state)
21st-century American politicians
21st-century American women politicians
Evans School of Public Policy and Governance alumni
Members of the Washington House of Representatives